Boisse is a surname. Notable people with the surname include: 

Érik Boisse (born 1980), French  fencer
Philippe Boisse (born 1955), French fencer

See also
Bosse (name)